Dingelstädt is a former Verwaltungsgemeinschaft ("collective municipality") in the district Eichsfeld, in Thuringia, Germany. The seat of the Verwaltungsgemeinschaft was in Dingelstädt. It was disbanded in January 2019.

The Verwaltungsgemeinschaft Dingelstädt consisted of the following municipalities:

 Dingelstädt 
 Helmsdorf 
 Kallmerode 
 Kefferhausen 
 Kreuzebra 
 Silberhausen

References

Former Verwaltungsgemeinschaften in Thuringia